Oot & Aboot is the fourth album by the band Real McKenzies, released in 2003.

Track listing
"Cross the Ocean" 
"Droppin' Like Flies" 
"Ye Banks and Braes"
"Get Lost" 
"Lest We Forget" 
"Heather Bells" 
"Dance Around the Whisky" 
"Oot & Aboot" 
"Shit Outta Luck"
"Jennifer Que"
"Drink the Way I Do"
"The Night the Lights Went Out in Scotland"
"Taylor Made"

External links
 realmckenzies.com

References

2003 albums
The Real McKenzies albums
Honest Don's Records albums